The Seattle Redhawks men's basketball team represents Seattle University in NCAA Division I basketball competition. Established in 1946, the team was previously known as the Seattle Chieftains. The program experienced success during the 1950s and 1960s, reaching the NCAA Division I tournament 11 times. Led by 1958 No. 1 draft pick Elgin Baylor, Seattle finished runner-up in the 1958 NCAA University Division basketball tournament.

Seattle was a member of NCAA Division I from 1946 to 1980, reclassified to NAIA in 1980, and rejoined the Division I level in 2008. They are a member of the Western Athletic Conference (2012–present). They were previously a member of the West Coast Conference (1971–1980). The current head coach is Chris Victor, who was previously the associate head coach.

History

1950s and 1960s: National prominence
Established in 1946, the program experienced a period of success during the 1950s and 1960s. Seattle produced more NBA players than any other school from 1960 to 1969. From 1953 to 1969, the Seattle Chieftains reached the NCAA tournament 11 times.

On January 21, 1952, the Seattle Chieftains beat the Harlem Globetrotters in a stunning 84–81 upset, led by Johnny O'Brien. Six years later, Elgin Baylor led the Chieftains to the championship game of the 1958 NCAA tournament, but fell to the Kentucky Wildcats  at Freedom Hall in Louisville on March 22. Despite finishing runner-up, Baylor was named the tournament's Most Outstanding Player and was the first selection of the 1958 NBA draft in April.

Notable alumni of Seattle University basketball include Elgin Baylor, Johnny O'Brien, Eddie O'Brien, Charlie Brown, Eddie Miles, Clint Richardson, John Tresvant, Tom Workman, Frank Oleynick, Charlie Williams, Jawann Oldham, Charles Garcia, and Plummer Lott.

The decline of local businesses such as Boeing (the largest employer in the region) in the late 1970s led to drastic cuts to keep the program steady, which included moving down to NAIA in 1980.

Cameron Dollar (2009–2017)
Seattle discontinued its men's basketball at the Division I level for some time, initially moving to NAIA in 1980. Seattle rejoined the NCAA as a Division III member and then as a Division II member in 2002; they joined the Great Northwest Athletic Conference that year.

In 2008, the program rejoined the Division I level. In 2009, Cameron Dollar was hired as the new men's basketball head coach to replace Joe Callero. Seattle University and University of Washington agreed to renew their rivalry by playing annually from 2009 to 2017 while rotating sites. In 2017, the two schools played in the 2K Sports Classic.

The Redhawks played as an independent for the next three years before seeking a conference. Seattle first applied to the West Coast Conference, where they played between 1971 and 1980, but were turned down. After declining an invitation to the now-defunct Great West Conference, Seattle applied for membership in the Big Sky Conference and Big West Conference but were again turned down. During the 2010–14 NCAA conference realignment, the Western Athletic Conference saw 12 of its members leave. In 2012, the WAC invited Seattle to join and Seattle accepted soon after.

Seattle began the 2012–13 season in the WAC, and for the 2013–14 season only three members from the prior year remained in the conference (Seattle, New Mexico State, and Idaho). The WAC added six new members for 2013–14, and once Idaho left for the Big Sky Conference in 2014–15, Seattle became the second-longest tenured WAC school after just three seasons in the league.

Seattle won their first WAC tournament game in the 2014–15 season, beating Chicago State and UMKC en route to the WAC tournament finals where they lost to New Mexico State. The Redhawks finished the regular season 16–15, and earned an invite to the College Basketball Invitational. It was the Redhawks' first appearance in a Division I postseason tournament since 1969. Seattle beat Pepperdine and Colorado in the first two rounds in the Connolly Center, before losing to Loyola (Ill.) in the semi-finals. Loyola (Ill.) would go on to win the tournament. In the 2015–16 season, Seattle was invited to the CBI again and hosted their first two games. After beating Idaho in the first round, the Redhawks fell to Vermont.

On March 13, 2017, Cameron Dollar was fired after compiling a 107–138 record and two CBI appearances at Seattle.

Jim Hayford (2017–2021)
On March 29, 2017, Jim Hayford was hired as the new men's basketball head coach to replace Dollar, coming from rival Eastern Washington University.

In his first year as head coach, Hayford compiled a 20–14 record, the Redhawks' first 20-win season since 2008 and first 20-win season in Division I play since the 1960s. The Redhawks fell to Central Arkansas in the first round of the 2018 CBI tournament. In his second year as head coach, Hayford compiled an 18–15 record, marking the Redhawks' first back-to-back 18+ win seasons since 2008–09 and 2009–10. The Redhawks fell to Presbyterian in the first round of the 2019 CIT tournament.

Home court

Seattle moved to KeyArena, just a few miles from campus, for men's basketball in 2009 when the Redhawks moved to Division I. KeyArena opened on October 26, 1995, and plays host to other sporting events, family events, and other entertainment. Despite seating just over 17,000 people, Seattle curtains off the upper deck and only sells tickets for the lower bowl and luxury boxes, making the official capacity for Redhawks games 8,901. 1,160 of that is luxury boxes.

Seattle has played a game at the ShoWare Center in Kent, Washington on select years since moving back to D1. The games are referred to as the "ShoWare Classic".

The Redhawk Center on the campus has been seldom used by the men's team as it only seats 999. Seattle U hosted their College Basketball Invitational games at the Redhawk Center in 2015 because KeyArena was in use for the NCAA men's basketball tournament.

The Redhawk Center hosted six Seattle U home games in 2016–2017, and ten the next season (2017–2018).  Climate Pledge Arena continues to be considered the program's primary home court; however, it is scheduled to be closed from 2018 to 2021 while being totally rebuilt.  Two early-season home games were played at the ShoWare Center in November 2018, but the rest of the 2018–2019 home schedule is being played on campus at the Redhawk Center.

Rivalries

Seattle U has two recognized rivals: Washington and Eastern Washington.

Washington

The two schools are only 2.8 miles apart and have met 33 times. Cameron Dollar came from Washington as an assistant under Lorenzo Romar, which helped restart the rivalry when the Redhawks returned to Division I. The schools first met in 1952, then played every season from 1969 to 1979 when Seattle U left the NCAA. Washington leads the series 29–4.

They have played every season since 2009 on a rotating home-court basis.

Eastern Washington

Seattle U and Eastern Washington have met 14 times since they first played in 2009. The "Intrastate Battle" rivalry game between them is sometimes played twice a season in a rotating home court basis, though sometimes is only played once.

The series is currently tied 7–7.

An establishing chapter began in 2017 when Jim Hayford left his head coaching position EWU for the same job at Seattle U. Hayford's assistant, Shantay Legans, was hired as his successor. On December 3, 2017, in Hayford's first game against his former team and assistant, Seattle U won 85–64

Season-by-season records

Postseason appearances

NCAA Division I tournament
The Redhawks have made the NCAA Division I tournament 11 times. They have not reached the NCAA Division I Tournament since 1969, which is the fifth longest drought between appearances in NCAA Division I Tournament history, although they were not in Division I for 29 years of the drought. The combined record for the Redhawks is 10–13.

NIT appearances
Seattle has made two appearances in the National Invitation Tournament (NIT). They have a combined record of 0–2.

CBI appearances
Seattle has made three appearances in the College Basketball Invitational (CBI). They have a combined record of 3–3.

CIT appearances
Seattle made their first appearance in the CIT tournament in 2019. They have a combined record of 0–1.

Retired numbers

References